DoorDash, Inc. is an American company that operates an online food ordering and food delivery platform. The company is based in San Francisco, California. It went public in December 2020 on NYSE and trades under the symbol DASH.

With a 56% market share, DoorDash is the largest food delivery company in the United States. It also has a 60% market share in the convenience delivery category. As of December 31, 2020, the platform was used by 450,000 merchants, 20,000,000 consumers, and one million deliverers.

DoorDash has been criticized and sued for withholding tips, reducing tip transparency, antitrust price manipulation, listing restaurants without permission, and allegedly misclassifying workers.

History
In late 2012, Stanford University students Tony Xu, Stanley Tang, Andy Fang and Evan Moore were getting feedback on a mobile app for small business owners when a macaroon store owner told them of her challenges meeting demand for deliveries.

In January 2013, they launched PaloAltoDelivery.com in Palo Alto, California. In the summer of 2013, it received US$120,000 in seed money from Y Combinator in exchange for a 7% stake. It incorporated as DoorDash in June 2013.

In December 2018, DoorDash overtook Uber Eats to hold the second position in total US food delivery sales, behind GrubHub. By March 2019, it had exceeded GrubHub in total sales, at 27.6% of the on-demand delivery market. By early 2019, DoorDash was the largest food delivery provider in the U.S., as measured by consumer spending. It maintained that market position in 2019.

In October 2019, DoorDash opened its first ghost kitchen, DoorDash Kitchen, in Redwood City, California, with four restaurants operating at the location.

In January 2020, it was reported that DoorDash had lied about skimming tips from its drivers, causing them to earn an average of $1.45 an hour after expenses, and that after the company had allegedly overhauled its tipping system, DoorDash was still manipulating per-delivery payouts at the expense of drivers.

By June 2020, DoorDash had raised more than $2.5 billion over several financing rounds from investors including Y Combinator, Charles River Ventures, SV Angel, Khosla Ventures, Sequoia Capital, SoftBank Group, GIC, and Kleiner Perkins.

In April 2020, during the COVID-19 pandemic, DoorDash announced it had "stockpiled tens of thousands of gloves and bottles of hand sanitizer" and was offering them to delivery drivers for free. The company also said it had changed the default drop-off option to contactless delivery. That month, DoorDash became the fastest growing food delivery service.

In October 2020, the company launched its "Reopen for Delivery" program to have brick-and-mortar restaurants that have closed due to the COVID-19 pandemic partner with local ghost kitchen operators to offer food delivery- and pick-up-only service.

In November 2020, DoorDash announced the opening of its first physical restaurant location, partnering up with Bay Area restaurant Burma Bites to offer delivery and pick-up orders.

On December 9, 2020, the company became a public company via an initial public offering, raising $3.37 billion. The price has seesawed from initial opening of $182 to a low of $112 in May 2021, a high of $257 in November 2021, to a new low of $58 in June 2022. By August 2022, the stock was trading at $82 per share.

In February 2021, 55% of DoorDash's drivers were women.

In May 2021, DoorDash was criticized for unauthorized listings of restaurants who had not given permission to appear on the app. The company was sued by Lona's Lil Eats in St. Louis, with the lawsuit claiming that DoorDash had listed them without permission, then prevented any orders to the restaurant from going through and redirecting customers to other restaurants instead, because Lona's was "too far away," when in reality it had not paid DoorDash a fee for listing. This aspect of DoorDash's business practice is illegal in California.

In August 2022, DoorDash announced it would end its partnership with Walmart in September, ending the companies' cooperation agreement from 2018.

In late November 2022, DoorDash announced plans to layoff 1,250 corporate employees, or about six percent of their workforce. This was to rein in expenses.

Markets 
DoorDash began expanding into international markets in 2015, launching in Toronto, Canada. The company started operating in markets outside North America in 2019, officially launching in Melbourne, Australia, in September and later expanding further into the country. In 2021, the company expanded its service area to Sendai, Japan in June and Stuttgart, Germany in November. In June 2022, the company expanded into the Wellington Region of New Zealand.

The company expanded its service offerings in 2020, adding grocery delivery initially in California and the Midwest in August 2020. DoorDash expanded the service offerings in 2021 to include DoubleDash, which allows for orders from multiple merchants, and alcohol delivery in 20 U.S. states, the District of Columbia, Canada, and Australia.

Acquisitions 
 Caviar – In October 2019, DoorDash acquired Caviar, a service specializing in food delivery from upscale urban-area restaurants that typically do not offer delivery, from Square, Inc. for $410 million.
 Scotty Labs – In August 2019, the company acquired Scotty Labs, a tele-operations startup company that focuses on self-driving and remote-controlled vehicle technology.
 Chowbotics – On February 8, 2021, DoorDash announced its acquisition of Chowbotics, a robotics company known for its salad-making robot. The companies did not disclose the terms of the deal, but Chowbotics was valued at $46 million in 2018.
 Wolt - On November 9, 2021, DoorDash announced its acquisition of the Finnish technology company Wolt for over $8.1 billion

Controversies, lawsuits, and criticism

Withholding of tips
In July 2019, the company's tipping policy was criticized by The New York Times, and later The Verge and Vox and Gothamist. Drivers receive a guaranteed minimum per order that is paid by DoorDash by default. When a customer added a tip, instead of going directly to the driver, it first went to the company to cover the guaranteed minimum. Drivers then only directly received the part of the tip that exceeded the guaranteed minimum per order.

A DoorDash customer filed a class action lawsuit against the company for its "materially false and misleading" tipping policy. The case was referred to arbitration in August 2020. Under pressure, the company revised its policy. The company settled a lawsuit with District of Columbia Attorney General Karl Racine for $2.5million, with funds going to deliverers, the government, and to charity.

Antitrust litigation
In April 2020, in the case of Davitashvili v. GrubHub Inc. DoorDash, Grubhub, Postmates, and Uber Eats were accused of monopolistic power by only listing restaurants on their apps if the restaurant owners signed contracts which include clauses that require prices be the same for dine-in customers as for customers receiving delivery. The plaintiffs stated that this arrangement increases the cost for dine-in customers, as they are required to subsidize the cost of delivery; and that the apps charge “exorbitant” fees, which range from 13% to 40% of revenue, while the average restaurant's profit ranges from 3% to 9% of revenue. The lawsuit seeks treble damages, including for overcharges, since April 14, 2016 for dine-in and delivery customers in the United States at restaurants using the defendants’ delivery apps. Although several preliminary documents in the case have now been filed, a trial date has not yet been set.

Data security
On May 4, 2019, DoorDash confirmed 4.9 million customers, delivery workers and merchants had sensitive information stolen via a data breach. Those who joined the platform after April 5, 2018, were unaffected by the breach.

Driver strike and tip transparency 
In July 2021, DoorDash drivers went on strike to protest lack of tip transparency and to ask for higher pay. At the time of the strike, and as of June 2022, DoorDash did not allow drivers to see the full tip amounts prior to accepting a delivery in the app. If customers tip over a set amount for the order total, Doordash hides a portion of the tip until the delivery is complete. The strike occurred after DoorDash rewrote its code to cut off access to Para, a third-party app that drivers had been using to see the full tip amounts.

Lawsuit by the city of Chicago 
In August 2021, the city of Chicago sued DoorDash and GrubHub. According to Chicago mayor Lori Lightfoot, the companies broke the law by using "unfair and deceptive tactics to take advantage of restaurants and consumers who were struggling to stay afloat [during the COVID-19 pandemic]." DoorDash and GrubHub denied the suit's merits.

2017 Class action lawsuit 
In 2017, a class action lawsuit was filed against DoorDash for allegedly misclassifying delivery drivers in California and Massachusetts as independent contractors. In 2022, a tentative settlement was reached in which DoorDash would pay $100 million total, with $61 million going to over 900,000 drivers, paying out just over $130 per driver, and $28 million for the lawyers. Gizmodo criticized the settlement, noting that the $413 million that DoorDash CEO Tony Xu received the previous year was one of the largest CEO compensation packages of all time.

Philanthropy
In 2018, DoorDash launched Project DASH, a partnership with local food security organizations to deliver donations to those in need. By August 2019, the program had expanded to 25 cities in the United States and Canada and had delivered more than one million pounds of food. As of September 2021, Project DASH operated in more than 900 cities and had delivered more than 15 million meals.

DoorDash partnered with the National Urban League in 2020 as part of its Main Street Strong program, which included a pledge of $200 million over five years to support restaurants during the coronavirus pandemic. The partnership with the NUL includes $12 million in funding to assist drivers of color in building job skills and financial literacy.

Algorithms 
DoorDash has an algorithm that chooses the best delivery route automatically. DoorDash's delivery system can learn on its own, and change according to parameters such as the number of delivery people available, the time of day, and how much food is expected to be ordered.

See also 
 Uber

References

External links
 

2013 establishments in California
2020 initial public offerings
American companies established in 2013
Companies based in San Francisco
Companies listed on the New York Stock Exchange
Internet properties established in 2013
Mobile applications
Online food ordering
Online food retailers of the United States
Retail companies established in 2013
Transport companies established in 2013
Y Combinator companies